Horse Chestnut (foaled 19 August 1995-died 19 February 2015) was a champion thoroughbred racehorse bred in South Africa by Harry F. Oppenheimer at his Mauritzfontein Stud in Kimberley. His sire Fort Wood was a son of the British champion sire, Sadler's Wells. He was defeated once in his racing career of 10 starts. He was nominated as the first equine inductee into the South African Equine Hall of Fame in 2019 but lost the vote to Sea Cottage.
Horse Chestnut had an interesting pedigree. He was out of the first Crop of Fort Wood a winner of the Grand Prix de Paris. His dam London Wall was a daughter of Col. Pickering(71) winner of the 1974 Dingaans and the 1976 Hawaii Stakes. Col. Pickering was a son of the Washington DC. International winner Wilwyn(48) who was imported into South Africa in 1959 after a 5 year stint at stud in the UK where he produced  Tenacity(58) the winner of the 1961 Yorkshire Oaks and the Japanese Champion Wildeal(56) winner of the 1959 Japanese Two Thousand Guineas. Wilwyn was Champion Sire in South Africa in 1965 and produced numerous stakes winners. Col. Pickering was given an outstanding opportunity at stud but was an absolute failure. London Wall came from a good family as she was a half sister to Bodrum(80) by Free Ride(61) winner of the South African Guineas and Champion Stakes.

Background 
Horse Chestnut was raced by Oppenheimer and his wife, Bridget. The colt won the South African Triple Crown and was named both Horse of the Year and Champion 3-year-old Colt at three. He ran 10 races, winning 9 and placing 3rd once. Notable wins include the Grade 1 J&B Metropolitan Stakes over 2000m by 8¼ lengths, the Grade I South African Derby over 2450m by 10 lengths, and the Grade I South African Classic over 1800m by 4 lengths.

Sent to race in the United States, he won the Grade III Broward Handicap at Gulfstream Park in Hallandale Beach, Florida, over 1700m by five and a half lengths. During his preparation for the Grade I Donn Handicap, Horse Chestnut fractured a piece of his splint bone on his near foreleg, resulting in his early retirement from racing. The Oppenheimers subsequently sold the majority of shares in Horse Chestnut to Seth Hancock's Claiborne Farm in Kentucky, where he went to stud. He was subsequently purchased by the Horse Chestnut Syndicate and relocated back to South Africa in 2009 and stood at Drakenstein Farm Stud where he stood 6 seasons until his death. He has produced a number of stakes winners but nothing remotely comparable to himself.

Horse Chestnut died on 19 February 2015 in his stall at Drakenstein Stud in South Africa. Autopsy revealed that heart failure was the cause of his death.

==Tabulated Race Record

See also
List of leading Thoroughbred racehorses

References

1995 racehorse births
2015 racehorse deaths
Racehorses bred in South Africa
Racehorses trained in South Africa
South African Thoroughbred Horse of the Year
Thoroughbred family 1-p